German Church may refer to:

Evangelical Church in Germany
Catholic Church in Germany
German Evangelical Church, the official Protestant church of the Third Reich
German Church, Christchurch
German Church, Gothenburg
German Church, Liverpool
German Church, Stockholm

Also
Trinity Church (Karlskrona), Karlskrona